Syed Human (born 1 January 1992) is a Pakistani cross-country skier. He competed in the men's 15 kilometre freestyle at the 2018 Winter Olympics.

References

External links
 

1992 births
Living people
Pakistani male cross-country skiers
Olympic cross-country skiers of Pakistan
Cross-country skiers at the 2018 Winter Olympics
Place of birth missing (living people)